Flaming Frontiers (1938) is a Universal movie serial starring Johnny Mack Brown. It was a remake of Heroes of the West (1932).  It was re-edited into a TV series in 1966. Much of the material was reused in Lon Chaney Jr.'s 1942 serial Overland Mail.

Synopsis
Prospector Tom Grant discovers found a rich gold vein up South. His findings however, soon attract landowner Bart Eaton. Tom's sister Mary heads for the gold fields with Eaton and his men following. Eaton teams up with Ace Daggett who plans to doublecross him and get the gold for himself. They then frame Tom for murder and then try to get him to sign over his claim. The scout Tex Houston is on hand, escaping the attempts on his life, saving Mary from various perils, and trying to bring in the real killer and clear Tom…

Cast
 Johnny Mack Brown as Tex Houston
 Eleanor Hansen as Mary Grant
 James Blaine as Bart Eaton
 Charles Stevens as Henchman Breed
 William Royle as Henchman Crosby
 Edward Cassidy as Henchman Joe
 Jack Rutherford as Buffalo Bill Cody / Daggett Henchman Rand 
 Charles Middleton as Ace Daggett
 Ralph Bowman as Tom Grant
 Chief Thundercloud as Thundercloud
 Horace Murphy as The Sheriff
 Karl Hackett as Daggett Henchman Jake
 Charles King as Daggett Henchman Blackie
 Jack Roper as Wolf Moran
 Bill Hazlett as Chief Spotted Elk
 James Farley as Wagonmaster Hawkins
 Eddy Waller as Andy Grant

Production
Along with Heroes of the West (1932) this serial was based on "The Tie That Binds" by Peter B. Kyne.

Chapter titles
 The River Runs Red
 Death Rides the Wind
 Treachery at Eagle Pass
 A Night of Terror
 Blood and Gold
 Trapped by Fire
 The Human Target
 The Savage Horde
 Toll of the Torrent
 In the Claws of the Cougar
 The Half Breed's Revenge
 The Indians Are Coming
 The Fatal Plunge
 Dynamite
 A Duel to the Death
Source:

See also
 List of American films of 1938
 List of film serials
 List of film serials by studio

References

External links
 

1938 films
1938 Western (genre) films
American Western (genre) films
American black-and-white films
Remakes of American films
1930s English-language films
Films based on American novels
Films based on Western (genre) novels
Films directed by Alan James
Films directed by Ray Taylor
Universal Pictures film serials
Films with screenplays by George H. Plympton
1930s American films